The Turkish Ice Hockey First League is the second highest level of ice hockey in Turkey, after the Turkish Ice Hockey Super League. It is operated under the jurisdiction of the Turkish Ice Hockey Federation, a member of the International Ice Hockey Federation.

2007-08 First League Clubs  
The clubs to play in the 2007-2008 season are listed below, alongside their home towns.

Champions

See also
Turkish Ice Hockey Super League
Turkey national men's ice hockey team
List of ice hockey leagues

References

Professional ice hockey leagues in Turkey
Sports leagues established in 2005
2005 establishments in Turkey
Turkey